Razumovski Palace can refer to two palaces built for Hetman Kirill Razumovski:
 Razumovski Palace, in Baturyn, Ukraine
 Razumovski Palace, in Hlukhiv, Ukraine